Belarusian National History and Culture Museum is a museum in Minsk, Belarus. 

The leading Museum of the historic profile of the Republic of Belarus is the biggest collection of the monuments of material and spiritual culture of the Belarusian people from the ancient times to modern day. It contains around 370,000 artefacts. Chronological frames of the museum fund are from 40,000 B.C. to present time. Several collections of the museum are of special value:
 Collection of materials on the history of primeval society including hunting, fishing, and agricultural instruments, domestic and ritual articles, ancient works of art and adornment
 Manuscripts and block letter books
 Collection «Belarusian folk costume» features both everyday and festal, ceremonial Belarusian clothes; there are costumes of different age and social groups of population
 Numismatics collection

The museum was established in 1957 as a museum of local lore, history, and economy. In 1991 it was reorganized to the National museum. In 1967, the museum was opened for visitors. At present, approximately 100,000 visitors attend the museum annually.

References 

Museums in Minsk
History museums in Belarus
Museums established in 1957
1957 establishments in the Soviet Union